Synsepalum kassneri is a species of plant in the family Sapotaceae. It is found in Kenya, Mozambique, Tanzania, and Zimbabwe.

References

kassneri
Vulnerable plants
Taxonomy articles created by Polbot